Yash Dasgupta (born as Debashish Dasgupta on 10 October 1985) is an Indian actor, television personality, politician. He works Hindi and Bengali Film industry. He started his career in television, and his movie debut was in the 2016 Bengali film Gangster, his upcoming Bollywood debut film Yaariyan 2. He was listed as the most desirable man in the Calcutta Times list of Most Desirable men in 2014, 2015 and 2020.

Dasgupta appeared in Bojhena Se Bojhena and Na Aana Is Des Laado. In 2006 he won the Glam King title in the Unish Kuri Streax Glam Hunt held in Kolkata. Dasgupta is also a politician and belongs to the Bharatiya Janata Party since 17 February 2021.

Early life 
Yash Dasgupta was born to Dipak Dasgupta and Jayati Dasgupta. His real name is Debashish. He has lived in Delhi, Mumbai, Madhya Pradesh, Sikkim among others and attended different schools.

Career

Early career 
Dasgupta won the Glam King title in the Unish Kuri Streax Glam Hunt held in Kolkata. Thereafter, he shifted his base to Mumbai to pursue career in acting, joined Roshan Taneja School of Acting, and got his first break as an actor in the television industry. Dasgupta began his acting career in selective roles on national television. He played a fun loving son as Suraj Dharamraj Mahiyavanshi in Bandini, and a character with grey shades as Ketan Sanghvi with Ram Kapoor in Basera
He played the role of Karan (Santosh's son, Diya and Jhanvi's cousin brother), in Na Aana Is Des Laado, a story which dealt with the social evil of female infanticide, and concentrates on the problems faced by women in a male-dominated world. 
Yash did episodic roles as Viraj, a mime artist in Adaalat.
He also enacted Demon Kalketu in a mythology called Mahima Shanidev Kii.

In Kolkata Yash had also participated in ETV Bangla celebrity dance reality show Ritur Mela Jhoom Tara Ra Ra which was directed by Shiboprosad Mukherjee

2013-2015 

Yash played the popular role of Aranya Singha Roy in Bojhena Se Bojhena, an adaptation in Bengali of the Hindi TV series Iss Pyaar Ko Kya Naam Doon? aired from 4 November 2013 to 18 June 2016.  In 2015, Yash had an accident on the sets of Bojhena Se Bojhena where his forearms were burnt while shooting a Diwali sequence.

2016-present (Films) 
Yash was launched in films by Shree Venkatesh Films.

The debut film of Yash Dasgupta was the 2016 romantic thriller Gangster directed by Birsa Dasgupta  and parts of it were shot in Istanbul Turkey  Yash was stranded with the film production unit amid the attempted military coup in Istanbul, Turkey Later the shooting of the film resumed.

Other appearances 
Dasgupta had performed in award ceremonies such as Colors Golden Petal Awards 2011 and Telly Academy Awards 2014. He performed in Jaya Hey, dedicated to the Kolkata Police. He had also anchored for the television award night, Star Jalsha Parivar Awards 2014.

Political career 

In March 2021, he had been declared to be the candidate of Bharatiya Janata Party from Chanditala for the 2021 West Bengal Legislative Assembly election to be held from 27 March 2021.  He lost the election to Indian Trinamool Congress candidate Swati Khandoker by 41347 votes.

Television

Filmography

Music videos

Awards and accolades

In the media
Dasgupta entered Times Of India's Most Desirable Men of 2014 and 2015 in the top 10.

References

External links
 
 

Living people
Male actors from Mumbai
Bengali male actors
Indian male television actors
21st-century Indian male actors
Indian male soap opera actors
1985 births
Male actors in Hindi television
Bharatiya Janata Party politicians from West Bengal
Indian male film actors
Male actors from West Bengal
Male actors in Hindi cinema